Al Dokali Al Sayed (born December 20, 1993) is a Libyan footballer that currently plays for Al Ahli as a midfielder. He has appeared in four AFC Champions League matches. His first appearance was as a substitute in the match against Al Shabab. He was then an unused substitute in the 3–3 draw with Tractor Sazi, and their following match, a 3–1 victory over Al Jazira. He returned to the side in the next game, scoring his first AFC Champions League goal in the reverse game against Tractor Sazi, a penalty at the start of the second half, having also made his first Champions League start of the season. His final appearance in that season's competition was as a substitute in their last group game, a 2–0 loss to Al-Ahli.

References

Living people
1993 births
Place of birth missing (living people)
Libyan footballers
Libyan expatriate footballers
El Jaish SC players
Al-Wakrah SC players
Al-Rayyan SC players
Al-Shahania SC players
Mesaimeer SC players
Al Ahli SC (Doha) players
Qatar Stars League players
Qatari Second Division players
Association football midfielders
Expatriate footballers in Qatar
Libyan expatriate sportspeople in Qatar